Enneboeus is a genus of cryptic fungus beetles, family Archeocrypticidae. There are at least two described species in Enneboeus. It is found in the Neotropics.

Species
These two species belong to the genus Enneboeus:
 Enneboeus caseyi Kaszab, 1981 i c g b
 Enneboeus marmoratus Champion, 1893 b
Data sources: i = ITIS, c = Catalogue of Life, g = GBIF, b = Bugguide.net

References

Further reading

 

Tenebrionoidea
Articles created by Qbugbot